Brashier Middle College Charter High School is a public funded charter school in Simpsonville, South Carolina, United States. It is a sister campus of the main Greenville Tech campus in Greenville, South Carolina.

GTC Connection 
Students attending BMCCHS are allowed to take college classes at Greenville Technical College free of charge through the Dual-Enrollment Program.

Sports 
The sports that Brashier offers are less than a typical school, just because it is a Charter School.

 Boys Varsity Basketball
 Boys JV Basketball
 Girls Varsity Basketball
 Swim
 Cross Country
 Men's Soccer
 Women's Soccer
 Softball
 Baseball
 Golf

Students can take other sports (such as track & field and football) at the public schools that they are zoned for.

The boys' cross country team were the SCHSL 1A State Champions in 2022. This was the first state championship in the schools history.

References

External links
Official website

Public high schools in South Carolina
Schools in Greenville County, South Carolina
Charter schools in South Carolina